"Goodbye to a World" is a song by American record producer Porter Robinson. It is the closing track for Robinson's debut studio album, Worlds, released on August 12, 2014.

Background and composition

"Goodbye to a World" features a Vocaloid voice, as Robinson thought the notion of a human and robot duet "was something that was really beautiful and touching". Robinson said that he wrote the song while the atmosphere was apocalyptic outside, since it was raining and a tree had collapsed. He saw the song as describing a "beautiful apocalypse", "[l]ike the idea of worlds being created and worlds being destroyed and the end of that album". This was one of his first times working with soundfonts. He considered the song to be one of the best at capturing the atmosphere of the album.

Reception and legacy
Derek Staples of Consequence of Sound said that the "modern breakcore" song "spotlight Robinson's more intricate big room capabilities." Earmilk declared that  "Goodbye To A World" "revisits the saddened robotic vocals [of Worlds] as Robinson soars from one end of the intensity spectrum to the next. One moment, the track is ripping apart the stitches on our broken hearts and the next, Robinson has us geared for some solid fist pumping." In 2015, the song was remixed by Chrome Sparks and included in Worlds Remixed.

In 2016, it was included in a list of the "saddest EDM songs" by EDM Sauce Stevo. Matthew Meadow from Your EDM said in 2018 that the song was "still one of the most iconic endings to a dance music album in the past decade. It encapsulates everything beautiful about the album and stamps a brilliant end to it all." In September that year, Mariah Carey sampled the song in her promotional single "GTFO". Robinson played the song in the Second Sky festival in 2019 and 2021.

References 

2014 songs
Porter Robinson songs
Song recordings produced by Porter Robinson
Songs written by Porter Robinson